The Second Broad River is a tributary of the Broad River in western North Carolina in the United States. Via the Broad and Congaree rivers, it is part of the watershed of the Santee River, which flows to the Atlantic Ocean.

See also 
 First Broad River
 List of North Carolina rivers

References 

 

Rivers of North Carolina
Rivers of Cleveland County, North Carolina
Rivers of McDowell County, North Carolina
Rivers of Rutherford County, North Carolina